John Sacca (born December 12, 1971) is a former American football quarterback in the Arena Football League who played for the Connecticut Coyotes. He played college football for the Penn State Nittany Lions and Eastern Kentucky Colonels. He also played in the World League of American Football for the Amsterdam Admirals.

Raised in Delran Township, New Jersey, Sacca played prep football at Delran High School.

His brother Tony Sacca also was a quarterback at Penn State.

References

1971 births
Living people
American football quarterbacks
Connecticut Coyotes players
Amsterdam Admirals players
Penn State Nittany Lions football players
Eastern Kentucky Colonels football players
Delran High School alumni
People from Delran Township, New Jersey
Players of American football from New Jersey
Sportspeople from Burlington County, New Jersey